The 1936 Peckham by-election was held on 6 May 1936.  The by-election was held due to the succession to the House of Lords of the incumbent Conservative MP, David Beatty, Viscount Borodale.  It was won by the Labour candidate Lewis Silkin, who defeated P. G. A. Harvey, son of Sir George Harvey, by 100 votes.

References

Peckham by-election
Peckham by-election
Peckham,1936
Peckham,1936
Peckham